The cittern or cithren (Fr. cistre, It. cetra, Ger. Cister, Sp. cistro, cedra, cítola) is a stringed instrument dating from the Renaissance. Modern scholars debate its exact history, but it is generally accepted that it is descended from the Medieval citole (or cytole). Its flat-back design was simpler and cheaper to construct than the lute. It was also easier to play, smaller, less delicate and more portable. Played by people of all social classes, the cittern was a premier instrument of casual music-making much as is the guitar today.

History

Pre-modern citterns 

The cittern is one of the few metal-strung instruments known from the Renaissance period. It generally has four courses (single, pairs or threes) of strings, one or more courses being usually tuned in octaves, though instruments with more or fewer courses were made. The cittern may have a range of only an octave between its lowest and highest strings and employs a re-entrant tuning – a tuning in which the string that is physically uppermost is not the lowest, as is also the case with the five-string banjo and most ukuleles for example. The tuning and narrow range allow the player a number of simple chord shapes useful for both simple song accompaniment and dances, however much more complex music was written for it. Its bright and cheerful timbre make it a valuable counterpoint to gut-strung instruments. The Spanish bandurria, still used today, is a similar instrument.

16th to 18th centuries 

From the 16th until the 18th century the cittern was a common English barber shop instrument, kept in waiting areas for customers to entertain themselves and others with, and popular sheet music for the instrument was published to that end. The top of the pegbox was often decorated with a small carved head, perhaps not always of great artistic merit; in Shakespeare's Love's Labour's Lost, the term "cittern-head" is used as an insult:

 HOLOFERNES: What is this?
 BOYET: A cittern-head.
 DUMAIN: The head of a bodkin.
 BIRON: A Death's face in a ring.

Just as the lute was enlarged and bass-extended to become the theorbo and chitarrone for continuo work, so the cittern was developed into the ceterone, with its extended neck and unstopped bass strings, though this was a much less common instrument.

Gérard Joseph Deleplanque (1723-1784) was a luthier from Lille who made a wide variety of instruments, including citterns.

The instrument maker Johann Wilhelm Bindernagel (around 1770-1845), who worked in Gotha, made a mixed guitar-cittern under the name "Sister" or "German Guitar", which was equipped with seven gut strings.

The leading 18th-century Swedish songwriter Carl Michael Bellman played mostly on the cittern, and is shown with the instrument (now in the National Museum, Stockholm) in a 1779 portrait by Per Krafft the elder.

Modern citterns 

In Germany, the cittern survives under the names Waldzither and Lutherzither. The last name comes from the belief that Martin Luther played this instrument. Also, the names Thüringer Waldzither in Thüringer Wald, Harzzither in the Harz mountains, Halszither in German-speaking Switzerland are used. There is a tendency in modern German to interchange the words for cittern and zither. The term waldzither came into use around 1900, to distinguish citterns from zithers.

The cittern family survives as the Corsican cetara and the Portuguese guitar. The guitarra portuguesa is typically used to play the popular traditional music known as fado. In the early 1970s, using the guitarra and a 1930s archtop Martin guitar as models, English luthier Stefan Sobell created a "cittern", a hybrid instrument primarily used for playing folk music, which has proved to be popular with folk revival musicians.

See also

 Chitarra Italiana
 English guitar
 Russian guitar
 Stringed instrument tunings
 Gregory Doc Rossi
 Martina Rosenberger

Bibliography
 Musick's Delight on the Cithren, John Playford (1666).
 Musick's Delight on the Modern Cittern, Vol.I., Robin Alexander Lucas (2021), ISBN 9781838438500. Vol.II. (2022), ISBN 9781838438517.
 Méthode pour Apprendre à Pincer du Cistre, ou Guitare Allemande, Charles Pollet (1786).

References

External links

 Renovata Cythara: The Renaissance Cittern Pages
 Stefan Sobell website
 G. Doc Rossi website
 Zistern: Europäische Zupfinstrumente von der Renaissance bis zum Historismus 
 Cittern Press (publisher of printed tune books for the modern cittern)
Citterns and cittern research at the Musikinstrumenten-Museum der Universität Leipzig
 Cittern, possibly by Petrus Raitta, England, 1579 at the National Music Museum
 Cittern, Urbino, ca. 1550 at the National Music Museum
 Decorated Cittern by Joachim Tielke, Hamburg, ca. 1685 at The Metropolitan Museum of Art

Early musical instruments
String instruments
Mandolin family instruments
Swiss musical instruments
Celtic musical instruments
English musical instruments
Scottish musical instruments